The canton of Lons-le-Saunier-1 is an administrative division of the Jura department, eastern France. It was created at the French canton reorganisation which came into effect in March 2015. Its seat is in Lons-le-Saunier.

It consists of the following communes:
 
Chille
Condamine
Courlans
Courlaoux
L'Étoile
Lons-le-Saunier (partly)
Montmorot
Saint-Didier
Villeneuve-sous-Pymont

References

Cantons of Jura (department)